Oceanicella is a genus of bacteria from the family of Rhodobacteraceae with one known species (Oceanicella actignis).

References

Rhodobacteraceae
Bacteria genera
Monotypic bacteria genera